Three Horseshoes may refer to:
Three Horseshoes, Southall, a pub in London, England
Three Horseshoes, Whitwick, a pub in Leicestershire, England
The Three Horseshoes, Monmouth, a pub in Monmouth, Wales
Three Horse Shoes railway signal box, near Turves, Cambridgeshire, England